Kyle Dixon (born November 26, 1984) is a professional lacrosse player with the Chesapeake Bayhawks of Major League Lacrosse. He played high school lacrosse for Archbishop Spalding High School in Severn, Maryland.

College career 
Dixon played college lacrosse at the University of Virginia from 2003 to 2006.  He won two Division I National Championships while with the Cavaliers, in 2003 and 2006.  Dixon was selected as a second-team All American during his junior season and a first-team All-American during his senior season while also being nominated as a Tewaaraton Trophy finalist. In 2006, he also won the McLaughlin Award as the nation's best midfielder.

Professional career 
2007: Dixon led the team in points with 22 goals and 17 assists for 41 total points.  He also recorded 23 ground balls on the season.  Dixon led all MLL midfielders in assists and was named to the 2007 MLL All-Star team and the All-MLL team. He also competed in the 2007 Bud Light Skills fastest shot competition.

2006: Dixon recorded 8 points in his rookie season with the Bayhawks.  His playing time was limited due to a hand injury he suffered in the Men's Lacrosse Division I National Championship Game.  Dixon was drafted second overall in the 2006 MLL Collegiate Draft by the Bayhawks.

Dixon leads the MLL all time in 2 point goals. As of 2012 Dixon has 47 career 2 point goals.

Statistics

Major League Lacrosse

External links 
Washington Bayhawks website
Washington Bayhawks Player Profile
Dixon Crushes Sophomore Slump
https://www.youtube.com/watch?v=Ss83-3RdlQM
https://www.youtube.com/watch?v=oySuDmhvPxU

1984 births
Living people
American lacrosse players
Chesapeake Bayhawks players
Major League Lacrosse players
Sportspeople from Annapolis, Maryland
Virginia Cavaliers men's lacrosse players
Lacrosse players from Maryland
Lacrosse midfielders